Vivato Technologies was founded to leverage wireless technology and IP (12+ patents) of a $100 million venture backed company (Vivato Inc.). It provides service to the growing demand for mobile broadband through the deployment of “Carrier Class” Wi-Fi switches or access points capable of delivering high-speed wireless connectivity directly to end users at distances exceeding 3 miles. 
Vivato's Base Stations use phased-array smart antennas to facilitate transmission over highly directed, narrow beams specifically suited for mobile device Wi-Fi. Vivato's headquarters is located in San Diego. The company's research and development center is in San Diego, CA. Business Development offices are in Manhattan, NY.

Telecommunications companies of the United States
Internet service providers of the United States
Companies based in San Diego
American companies established in 2010
2010 establishments in California